Frederica Smith Wilson (born Frederica Patricia Smith, November 5, 1942) is an American politician who has been a member of the United States House of Representatives since 2011, representing . Located in South Florida, Wilson's congressional district, numbered as the 17th during her first term, covers a large swath of eastern Miami-Dade County and a sliver of southern Broward County. The district contains most of Miami's majority-black precincts, as well as parts of Opa-locka, North Miami, Hollywood, and Miramar. Wilson gained national attention in 2012 for her comments on the death of Trayvon Martin.

Wilson is a member of the Democratic Party. The seat to which she was elected became available when the incumbent, Kendrick Meek, ran for a seat in the Senate in 2010.

Wilson is known for her large and colorful hats, of which she owns several hundred. She has gone through efforts to get Congress to lift its ban on head coverings during House sessions, which dates to 1837.

Early life, education, and early career
Wilson was born Frederica Smith on November 5, 1942, in Miami, Florida, the daughter of Beulah (née Finley) and Thirlee Smith. Her maternal grandparents were Bahamian. Wilson earned her bachelor of arts degree from Fisk University in 1963 and her master of arts degree from the University of Miami in 1972, both in elementary education. She served as the principal of Skyway Elementary School in Miami. In 1992 she left her position as principal to serve on the Miami-Dade County School Board. While a member of the school board, Wilson started 5,000 Role Models of Excellence, an in-school mentoring program.

Florida legislature
Wilson represented the 104th district in the Florida House of Representatives from 1998 to 2002. She then represented the 33rd district in the Florida Senate from 2002 until her election to Congress in 2010, when term limits prevented her from running again. She served as Minority Leader Pro Tempore in 2006, then Minority Whip.

An early supporter of Barack Obama's 2008 presidential campaign, she voted for Obama and Joe Biden in 2008 as one of Florida's presidential electors.

U.S. House of Representatives

Committee assignments
 Committee on Education and Labor
 Subcommittee on Early Childhood, Elementary and Secondary Education
 Subcommittee on Higher Education and Workforce Investment (Chair)
 Committee on Transportation and Infrastructure
 Subcommittee on Highways and Transit
 Subcommittee on Railroads, Pipelines, and Hazardous Materials
 Subcommittee on Water Resources and Environment

Caucus memberships
 Congressional Black Caucus
Congressional Arts Caucus
Congressional NextGen 9-1-1 Caucus
Congressional Progressive Caucus
Medicare for All Caucus

2010 election

When Kendrick Meek retired from Florida's 17th congressional district to run for the United States Senate in 2010, Wilson ran for the open seat and won the Democratic nomination. She won the November 2 general election without electoral opposition in a district where the Democratic nomination is tantamount to election.

2012 election

2014 election

2016 election

2018 election

2020 election

Tenure
Education
During her career as an educator, Wilson founded the 5000 Role Models program, which seeks to bring down dropout rates. Since her time in the Florida legislature, she has strongly opposed standardized testing. She has expressed concern with the Florida Comprehensive Assessment Test (FCAT), suggesting that the funds spent administering it would be better spent on improving education by hiring more teachers, and proposing in 2012 that tutoring companies be banned from exploiting vulnerable children, "even if it means banning companies like Ignite! Learning, founded by ex-Governor Jeb Bush's brother, Neil".

Tea Party
Wilson has vocally opposed the Tea Party. At a Miami town hall meeting in 2011, she told citizens to remember that the Tea Party is the real enemy and that they hold Congress hostage. She said they had one goal: "to make President Obama a one-term president".

Trayvon Martin case
Wilson took a vocal stance in the death of Trayvon Martin, a constituent of hers whose family she said she had known all her life. She was both praised and criticized for saying shortly after the killing that the motive of the accused, George Zimmerman, was racism. She suggested in March 2012 that Zimmerman had "hunted" Martin based simply on his race. She said, "Mr. Zimmerman should be arrested immediately for his own safety."

In March 2012, in a statement on the House floor, Wilson said, "Justice must be served. No more racial profiling!" Calling the incident a "classic example of racial profiling quickly followed by murder", she called for Zimmerman to be arrested. Wilson organized a rally in Miami on April 1, 2012, calling for Zimmerman's imprisonment. She criticized Florida's self-defense gun law, the "Stand Your Ground" law, in the wake of Martin's killing, even though she voted for it as a legislator. She said that when new laws work against the people, the laws "should be looked at and repealed". In April 2012, Wilson said that Martin's death was "definitely" murder. On July 13, 2013, a jury acquitted Zimmerman of the charges of second-degree murder and manslaughter.

Concern was raised about Wilson's outspoken comments, with some asking if her rhetoric was "making it more difficult for the prosecutor to do her job". Wilson has been calling for tougher laws to prevent racial profiling.

Anti-hazing

Wilson led efforts to combat bullying and hazing both as the South Atlantic regional director for Alpha Kappa Alpha sorority and as a member of Congress. A Miami Herald reporter nicknamed her "The Haze Buster" for her public stance against hazing. She was part of a coalition of African-American fraternity and sorority leaders who launched an anti-hazing campaign after the 2011 death of Florida A&M drum major Robert Champion Jr.

Recognition

MSNBC's "The Grio", an African-American news and opinion platform, named Wilson to "The Grio 100" for 2012.

Shooting of Charles Kinsey

After the release of the video showing police shooting mental health therapist Charles Kinsey in her district, Wilson tweeted in July 2016 that she was shocked and angered by Kinsey's shooting, adding, "Like everyone else I have one question: Why?"

Death of La David Johnson
Following the death of Sergeant La David Johnson on October 4, 2017, in an attack in Niger, Wilson told the press that on October 16, 2017, President Donald Trump had called Johnson's widow while she was on the way to Miami International Airport for the arrival of Johnson's remains. In the car with her were Johnson's mother and other family members, as well as Wilson, a longtime friend of the family. The widow put the call on speakerphone so that Wilson and others in the car heard it. Wilson said Trump "was almost like joking" and that he said "he [Johnson] knew what he signed up for, but I guess it still hurt". Trump later called Wilson's characterization of the conversation a "fabrication". Johnson's mother confirmed Wilson's account on October 18, at which point the White House ceased disputing Wilson's account of the call and instead claimed that she was "mischaracterizing the spirit" of the conversation. On October 23, Johnson's widow also confirmed Wilson's account.

On October 19, 2017, White House Chief of Staff John F. Kelly gave a press briefing at the White House. A gold star parent who was present at Trump's end during the phone conversation, Kelly did not deny that Trump said the words reported. But he defended Trump's comments "forcefully and emotionally", saying that Trump "in his way tried to express that opinion that he's a brave man, a fallen hero". He also attacked Wilson for having listened to the phone call and claimed that she had a "history of politicizing what should be sacred moments", citing the 2015 dedication of an FBI field office in Miami as an example. He claimed that her speech at that ceremony was "about how she was instrumental in getting the funding for that building" from then-President Obama.

On December 18, 2019, Wilson voted to impeach Trump.

Personal life
Wilson married Paul Wilson in 1963 and was widowed when he died in 1988. She has three children. She is an Episcopalian.

Wilson is an avid wearer of hats. She has a large collection that includes hundreds of hats of different varieties. She is known to wear one every day. During the tenure of former House Speaker John Boehner, she unsuccessfully asked him to waive the United States House of Representatives ban on head covering. The rule was partially relaxed after the election of two Muslim women to congress in 2018, one of whom, Ilhan Omar, wore a hijab to her swearing in on January 3, 2019.

Wilson is a member of The Links.

Electoral history

See also
 List of African-American United States representatives
 Women in the United States House of Representatives

References

External links

 Congresswoman Frederica Wilson official U.S. House website
 Frederica Wilson for U.S. Congress
 
 

 Representative Frederica S. Wilson (1998–2002) at the Florida House of Representatives

1942 births
2008 United States presidential electors
21st-century American politicians
21st-century American women politicians
African-American Episcopalians
African-American members of the United States House of Representatives
African-American state legislators in Florida
African-American women in politics
American people of Bahamian descent
Female members of the United States House of Representatives
Fisk University alumni
Democratic Party Florida state senators
Living people
Democratic Party members of the United States House of Representatives from Florida
Democratic Party members of the Florida House of Representatives
Politicians from Miami
School board members in Florida
American school principals
University of Miami School of Education alumni
Women state legislators in Florida
Women school principals and headteachers
21st-century African-American women
21st-century African-American politicians
20th-century African-American people
20th-century African-American women